Herman Frederick Crane, (March 22, 1918 – August 21, 2008) was an American film and television actor and radio announcer. He is probably best known for his role as Brent Tarleton in the 1939 film, Gone with the Wind, speaking the opening lines in the movie during the opening scene with Scarlett O'Hara (Vivien Leigh) and Stuart Tarleton (George Reeves).

Biography
Crane was born in New Orleans, Louisiana in 1918. Along with his brothers John and Harry, he grew up on General Pershing St. and went to the MacDonough #13 and Alcee Fortier schools. His father was a dentist, whose father and grandfather also were dentists. Fred was to break the trend, getting into acting and football at both Loyola and Tulane Universities. His first job in his teens was working in his spare time for an ice delivery service, back before electric refrigerators had caught on.

Around the time he was 20, his mother gave him that legendary "$50 and a suitcase" to come out to Hollywood and get into motion pictures, impressed that a neighbor's daughter had signed a movie contract, but also knowing that her son had the mettle to perform (on stage at college, and later in film, television and radio).

At first he stayed with relatives as well as taking a job at the local zoo to pay the rent, after which at night he would read books to a relative whose vision was deteriorating. It wasn't too long before he was invited on that fateful trip to Selznick International Pictures, where his cousin, Leatrice Joy Gilbert, (daughter of Leatrice Joy) was going to audition for the part of Suellen in the movie, "Gone With the Wind." He was taking in all the sights and sounds of the studio, when during a discussion, his authentic Southern accent combined with striking good looks landed him a meeting with Gone With The Wind first director George Cukor and producer David O. Selznick, which led to a script reading with Vivien Leigh, who had been chosen to play Scarlett O'Hara. Selznick was impressed, and signed Crane to a 13-week contract at $50 a week.

Even though he had not intended to try out for a job that day, Fred's many years of study and immersion into the arts gave him remarkable abilities as a renaissance raconteur, able to recite verse on the spur of the moment, or launch into any one of thousands of songs from the spark of a conversation... and his voice and quick wit helped him meet the challenges of many opportunities, whether acting or as a craftsman.

Fred played the part of Brent Tarleton, one of Scarlett's suitors, and spoke the opening lines in the film. One of the lasting Trivial Pursuit questions was initiated for all time, when an error in the credits listed his name as Stuart, who was actually played by George Reeves, who among his many roles, is also fondly remembered as Superman in the TV series. It was deemed too costly to fix this, so it endures this way, but when watching and listening to the dialogue, it is clear who George and Fred play in the movie. Brent speaks the opening lines of the movie, "What do we care if we were expelled from college, Miss Scarlett? The war's going to start soon, so we would have left college anyhow."

He did not attend the film's 1939 premiere in Atlanta, although he attended the premiere in Los Angeles with his good friend and "twin," George Bessolo Reeves, at Carthay Circle Theatre.  In later years (June 1998), he was one of the special guests at the celebrity-studded premiere screening of the restored version of Gone With The Wind hosted by Ted Turner in Atlanta.

In 1940, he married his first wife, Marcelle Dudley, and later went on to marry another four times. As he began a family, World War II limited his options as acting work was difficult to come by, and so he began tutoring at Crossroads of the World, one of his film students being Gene L. Coon (well known for his work on the first season of Star Trek: The Original Series), and also working in a munitions factory until the war came to a close.

Shortly afterward in 1946, he interviewed with Errett Lobban Cord, then-owner of KFAC (1330 AM), which had recently completed an evolution to a fine arts/classical music format. Fred was hired part-time, (a second vocation attributed to his vocal prowess) for his exquisite speaking voice and extensive familiarity with musical compositions. He had done and continued to do other radio programs simultaneously, such as staff voice actor on The Jack Benny Program (on NBC Radio), and other announcing roles. He had mastered a remarkable talent for not only the retention of information, performances and musical acuity in general, but classical music in particular (and the capable pronunciation of all the languages and dialects that entails), partly from his college studies, but also a great deal from being a very dedicated follower of the Walter Damrosch radio program for many of his younger years.

He continued to dabble in film, working on the Cisco Kid television series (one of the first to be shot in color) in an episode entitled The Gay Amigo (1949), with Duncan Renaldo as the Kid and Leo Carrillo as Pancho. He eventually appeared in several TV shows, including guest roles and staff roles on shows such as Lost in Space, Voyage to the Bottom of the Sea, Twilight Zone, Peyton Place, Lawman, Hawaiian Eye, and 77 Sunset Strip. He also appeared on General Hospital later in the 1970s, and continued taking on occasional jobs in narration.

His family continued to grow, leading him to explore other, more dependable work options as well, as many struggling actors would attest. He spent several years working at a pharmacy, several more years as a fine tools machinist and inspector, and several years in housing construction partnership, all the while working part-time at KFAC until a full-time position opened up in the 1960s.

About a decade later, he was promoted to AM Program Director (Carl Princi was the FM Director) in addition to the duties of performing his 6-hour morning show live (Hark, the Glad Sounds), and recording voice tracks and commercials for the all-night show (Music Out of the Night) for several hours each weekday after his show completed at noon. His show was frequently in the top 5 of drive-time popularity, ranked by polls in the Los Angeles Herald-Examiner during that time.

As a signature opening for his radio show, he'd often start with the great opening of "Gone With The Wind", and then his introduction.  He would not mention it, but it was a light remembrance of his having the first line in GWTW.

Fred continued with the radio station after it moved from Prudential Square (near Wilshire and La Brea) to new quarters on Yucca St. in Hollywood, until the day when most of the older staff were dismissed without notice in 1987. Those who were fired eventually won their case against this issue in an age discrimination suit. Fred continued to work in radio for several years after that, at KKGO, which was partly jazz, partly classical programming at that time.

He semi-retired in the 1990s, beginning a tour of several years of appearances for fans and special events, as well as cruise ship lectures and continuing on charity fundraisers for PBS station KCET.

The new millennium took him full circle back to the Southern states, where he and his fifth wife, Terry Lynn, bought an antebellum mansion in Barnesville, Georgia and turned it into Tarleton Oaks, a bed-and-breakfast with a Gone With The Wind museum, where guests could view artifacts from the film. Tarleton Oaks was sold at an auction in 2007 due to Crane's failing health, and as a part of the experience attendees were treated to a few hours of fond recollections from his early days in the film industry.

Around 2003, Fred had developed difficulties with diabetes, which he unfortunately acquired shortly after his second heart surgery.  He'd had successful surgery to repair a vein in his leg, which had limited circulation due to the combination of diabetes and a previous heart operation in which the vein had been removed for heart bypass surgery. Unfortunately, infection had escalated in the leg, prolonging the hospital stay, and he contracted a pulmonary embolism a few days later, passing away at 12:10 p.m. Eastern Time on August 21, 2008.

He was the last male surviving actor who played an adult role in the film, leaving the two remaining males Mickey Kuhn, who played Beau Wilkes as a child, and Patrick Curtis, who was one of several infants who played Melanie's baby in GWTW.

"I am but a small shard in a grand mosaic." – Fred Crane

Filmography

References

External links

 
 , with makeup still from Gone With the Wind, with George Reeves

1918 births
2008 deaths
20th-century American male actors
American male film actors
American male television actors
Loyola University New Orleans alumni
Male actors from New Orleans
Tulane University alumni